Castello De Sterlich-Aliprandi (Italian for De Sterlich-Aliprandi Castle)  is a fortified palace in Nocciano, Province of Pescara (Abruzzo).

History 

Viva Dio

Architecture

References

External links

De Sterlich-Aliprandi
Nocciano